Dave McCulloch may refer to:

 David McCulloch (1912–1979), Scottish footballer
 Dave McCulloch (Australian footballer) (born 1937), former Australian rules footballer
 David McCulloch (judge) (1832–1907), Illinois lawyer and judge